Caballo Lake State Park is a state park of New Mexico, United States, located  south of Truth or Consequences on the Rio Grande. Caballo Lake was created in the 1930s when an earthen dam was built across the Rio Grande.

The primary attraction of the lake is fishing, with bass and walleye fishing most popular.

References

External links
 Caballo Lake State Park

State parks of New Mexico
Parks in Sierra County, New Mexico
Protected areas established in 1964
Rio Grande